This is a list of awards and nominations received by Red Velvet, a South Korean girl group formed in 2014, by SM Entertainment. Since their debut, the group has received various awards and nominations for music, performances, popularity and impact, including four Circle Chart Music Awards, five Golden Disc Awards, four Melon Music Awards and two Mnet Asian Music Awards, among others.

After debuting with "Happiness" as a four-member group in August 2014, the group won several Rookie awards from award shows in their native country South Korea such as the Golden Disc Awards and Seoul Music Awards. In 2015, they released their debut EP Ice Cream Cake, now as a five-member group following the inclusion of Yeri. The EP won Digital Bonsang at the Golden Disc Awards while its title track won Best Female Dance at the 2015 Melon Music Awards and Best Dance Performance (Female Group) at the 2015 Mnet Asian Music Awards. The same year they released their first studio album The Red. 

In 2016, they released "Russian Roulette" from the EP of the same name, its music video was praised and won Best Music Video at the 2016 Melon Music Awards. The following year they released five singles, among them was "Red Flavor", the song was their first number one at the Circle Digital Chart and was nominated for Song of the Year at various awards. Additionally, it won Best K-Pop Song at the Korean Music Awards. At the 2017 Mnet Asian Music Awards, they won Best Female Group for "Red Flavor". The same year they released their second studio album Perfect Velvet, which was nominated for Album Bonsang at the 32nd Golden Disc Awards. 

In 2018, they released their first reissue The Perfect Red Velvet, its lead single "Bad Boy" was critically acclaimed and was nominated for Best Dance Performance (Female Group) at the 2018 Mnet Asian Music Awards and Best Pop Song at the Korean Music Awards. Later in the year the single "Powe Up" was released, it won Song of the Year – August at the Gaon Chart Music Awards and was nominated for Song of the Year at the Genie Music Awards. Also in 2018, the group received a commendation awarded at the Korean Popular Culture and Arts Awards, hosted by the South Korean Ministry of Culture, Sports and Tourism, given to recognize individuals or groups for their contribution to popular culture in South Korea and abroad. 

In late 2019 they released "Psycho" as the lead single for their first compilation album The ReVe Festival: Finale, the song won Song of the Year – December at the Gaon Chart Music Awards, Digital Bonsang at the 35th Golden Disc Awards and was nominated for the Melon Music Award for Song of the Year, their first nomination for the award. It was also nominated for Best K-Pop at the 2020 MTV Video Music Awards, being their first MTV VMA nomination. In 2022, "Feel My Rhythm" was released, its music video won Best Music Video at the 2022 Genie Music Awards.
  


Awards and nominations

Other accolades

State and cultural honors

Listicles

See also 
 Awards and nominations received by Irene
 Awards and nominations received by Seulgi
 Awards and nominations received by Wendy
 Awards and nominations received by Joy

Notes

References 

Red Velvet
Awards